Oak Ridge Military Academy (ORMA) is a college-preparatory military school in northwestern Guilford County, North Carolina. The school is the third oldest military academy in the United States and the first military boarding school to admit girls. The academy is located in the town of Oak Ridge, North Carolina, and is accredited by the Southern Association of Colleges and Schools (SACS).

Oak Ridge was created in 1852 by locals who wanted to encourage education in Guilford County. The school was closed during the Civil War for four years, reopening in 1866. From 1875 to 1914, the school was led by J. Allen Holt and Martin Holt, two professors at the academy. During that period it became one of the best in North Carolina. In 1914, leadership was transferred to Thomas E. Whittaker. The same year, a fire destroyed several buildings. In 1981, the name of the school was changed to Oak Ridge Military Academy.

The campus contains 21 buildings. Notable structures include Alumni Hall and Benbow Hall. Oak Ridge offers extracurriculars that mainly focus on physical activity and military strategy. During the 2019–2020 school year, Oak Ridge had 50 students enrolled. The academy offers 11 honors and 3 AP (Advanced Placement) courses.

History

Founding (1852–1914) 
Oak Ridge was established in 1852 by local families in the surrounding community, some of them associated with the Society of Friends (Quakers). The school traces its origins to April 7, 1850, when forty-three local citizens of the northwestern Guilford County community "desirous of promoting the cause of education" contributed a total of $629 for the construction of a new schoolhouse. The school, originally conceived as Oak Ridge Male Institute, changed its name to Oak Ridge Institute in 1854 prior to opening, to reflect that a limited number of females from the local community would also attend the school.

Oak Ridge Institute opened on March 3, 1853, with a classical curriculum of 18 courses and 63 students from North Carolina and Virginia. By 1856 it had 85 students, roughly three-quarters of whom were from places other than Oak Ridge. Through 1861, the school continued to evolve from a local community school to a regional boarding "finishing" school. The American Civil War closed the school from 1862 to 1866, all except four of the eligible-aged students (probably about 100) enlisting or conscripted into Southern units.

The night before the school was set to open in September 1865, the main schoolhouse burned down. The school reopened after the Civil War, but found challenges operating during Reconstruction. From 1875 to 1914 Oak Ridge was led by two brothers, Professors J. Allen Holt and Martin Holt. Under them the Oak Ridge Institute became one of the leading prep schools in North Carolina, boasting business and humanities departments, literary and debating societies, and sports teams which regularly played Wake Forest College (University), the University of North Carolina at Chapel Hill, and Trinity College (later Duke University) in football and baseball. Several of the academy's baseball players went on to play in the major leagues.

New leadership (1914–1981) 

In 1914, the leadership of the school transitioned to Professor Thomas E. Whitaker. After a devastating fire that destroyed the main schoolhouse and the Chapel on January 14, 1914, Whitaker rebuilt Oak Ridge into a military academy.  During the First World War, the Junior Reserve Officer Training Program (JROTC) was admitted to the campus and in 1929 Oak Ridge officially became an all-male military secondary school, changing its name to Oak Ridge Military Institute. From 1929 to 1967, Oak Ridge included a junior college program, in addition to the high school curriculum. During the Second World War, 127 of the academy's alumni were awarded a Purple Heart, and another 27 alumni earned the Silver Star. In 1972, Oak Ridge became the first military high school in the United States to admit females, which prompted a name change to Oak Ridge Academy, dropping "military" from the name as JROTC participation was optional for girls. By 1981, all students, male and female, were required to participate in JROTC, and the school name was changed to Oak Ridge Military Academy.  Oak Ridge was the oldest military high school in the United States still in operation, and the third oldest military academy.

Modern day (1981–present) 
Since 1972, Oak Ridge has been a private, coeducational, college-preparatory military boarding school (with a limited day student enrollment, mostly from the local community). It is one of the eight coed military academies in the U.S. The Oak Ridge Military Academy Historic District was listed on the National Register of Historic Places in 1983. The Academy is divided into a middle school (grades 7–8), and a high school (grades 9–12). Oak Ridge is the official military school of North Carolina, as designated by the state legislature in 1991. Oak Ridge is accredited by the Southern Association of Colleges and Schools (SACS), and it was first accredited by SACS in 1899. ORMA is also a member of the National Association of Independent Schools (NAIS), the North Carolina Association of Independent Schools (NCAIS), and the Association of Military Schools and Colleges of the United States (AMSCUS). It is the only active military school to have won the National High School Drill Team Championship (1996). 

In the fall of 2006, the academy launched their "Campaign for Renovation and Repairs", which raised $216,000. The funds were used to get a new roof, repair buildings, add fences and columns, and build new additions to the school.

Campus 

The Oak Ridge Military Academy Historic District encompasses 21 contributing buildings and 1 contributing structure.  They include the Queen Anne style Oakhurst (1897) designed by Frank P. Milburn (1868–1926); the home of Martin H. Holt; Maple Glade (1905); the home of J. Allen Holt; the Oakland Park Hotel (Benbow Hall, 1905, destroyed in fire in 1993); the old Donnell and Holt Store (now Cottrell Hall, c. 1900); the Alumni Building (1914); Chapel (1914); Whitaker Dormitory; Holt Dormitory; King Gymnasium (1920s); and Infirmary (1938).

The district is located within the town limits of Oak Ridge, North Carolina. It is seven miles north of the Piedmont Triad International Airport and Interstate 40, and is approximately eight miles northwest of Greensboro, North Carolina's third-largest city. Located on campus is Alumni Hall, a two-story, multi-purpose building that was designed by C. Will Armfield and built in 1914. The building has a 15-bay facade with a tetrastyle portico on its exterior. Benbow Hall is a frame structure built in 1905 to house classrooms. The building was built in 1905 in the Mission Style and was named to honor the longtime chairman of the board of Oak Ridge, Jesse Benbow. The academy also features a small Revival Style chapel on campus grounds.

Academics

Enrollment 
As of the 2019–2020 school year, 50 students were enrolled at Oak Ridge. 62% of the student body is White; 16% is Black; 14% is Asian, and 8% are of other races. The academy has 12.9 teachers (FTE) and a student-to-teacher ratio of 3.9. 98 percent of the academy's students are accepted to colleges. Oak Ridge tuition is $17,000 for the 2023–2024 school year.

Programs 
Oak Ridge's classes are split between four departments and a miscellaneous category. These departments are English, Math, Science and History. The academy offers 11 honors classes, and 3 AP courses.

Extracurriculars 
Oak Ridge hosts a "Junior Cadet Leadership Challenge" camp annually. The camp takes place over the course of five days, and includes physical activities, leadership training, and STEM training. Oak Ridge publishes a biannual magazine called the Oak Leaf. The magazine covers campus news, school events, obituaries, and alumni.

Notable alumni

 Zeb Alley  served in U.S. Army and received a Bronze Star during the Korean War; later served in North Carolina Senate
 Dale Earnhardt Jr.  race-car driver for NASCAR, has 26 NASCAR Monster Energy Cup Series wins and 246 Top-10 finishes
 Ray Hayworth  former Major League Baseball player, manager, and scout
 Red Hayworth  former Major League Baseball player, manager, coach, and scout
 Jessica Hernandez  lead singer of the Detroit-based soul and pop music band Jessica Hernandez & the Deltas
 Alvin Paul Kitchin  Democratic Party Congressman from North Carolina in the Eighty-fifth, Eighty-sixth, and Eighty-seventh Congresses
 George Parrott  officer in the United States Navy during World War I, receiving the Navy Cross, later honored for his service by his namesake on the US Navy Destroyer USS Parrott (DD-218)
 George Stephens  civic and business leader, credited with catching the first forward pass in American football in 1895

References

External links
 

Boarding schools in North Carolina
Schools in Guilford County, North Carolina
Private high schools in North Carolina
Military high schools in the United States
Educational institutions established in 1852
Schools accredited by the Southern Association of Colleges and Schools
Private middle schools in North Carolina
School buildings on the National Register of Historic Places in North Carolina
Historic districts on the National Register of Historic Places in North Carolina
Queen Anne architecture in North Carolina
Mission Revival architecture in North Carolina
National Register of Historic Places in Guilford County, North Carolina
1852 establishments in North Carolina